Victor Henry Schwall (January 25, 1925 – October 14, 2000) was an American football halfback who played professionally  in the National Football League (NFL) for four seasons with the Chicago Cardinals.

References

External links
 

1925 births
2000 deaths
American football halfbacks
Chicago Cardinals players
Northwestern Wildcats football players
Sportspeople from Oak Park, Illinois
Players of American football from Illinois
Carl Schurz High School alumni